Palovice may refer to:
Pálovice, a village in the Czech Republic
Paloviče, a settlement in Slovenia